The Iazul Morilor Prahova is an old artificial canal in Prahova County, Romania, built for a succession of water mills. The original water mills for which the canal was built have been dismantled and do not exist any more. At present the canal is used for local water supply and irrigation.

References

Canals in Romania
CIazul Morilor Prahova
CIazul Morilor Prahova